Ives is an unincorporated community in Stoddard County, in the U.S. state of Missouri.

Ives was established c. 1920, and named after John Ivester, an early settler.

References

Unincorporated communities in Stoddard County, Missouri
Unincorporated communities in Missouri
1920 establishments in Missouri